The 2022 ASUN men's basketball tournament was the conference postseason tournament for the ASUN Conference. The tournament was the 43rd year the league has conducted a postseason tournament. The tournament was held March 1, 3, 5, and 8, 2022 at campus sites of the higher seeds. The winner, Bellarmine, did not receive the conference's automatic bid to the 2022 NCAA Division I men's basketball tournament due to not being eligible because of a transition from Division II. Instead the regular season conference champion, Jacksonville State, was awarded the conference's automatic bid.

Seeds 
All teams in the conference qualified for the tournament. Teams were seeded by their record in conference play, with a tiebreaker system to seed teams with identical conference records. The top two teams from each division received byes into the quarterfinals. Kennesaw State got a higher seed than North Florida through the NET ranking tiebreaker.

The two tiebreakers used by the ASUN are: 1) head-to-head record of teams with identical record and 2) NCAA NET Rankings available on day following the conclusion of ASUN regular season play. These tiebreakers are also used to separate teams with the same seed from opposite divisions if necessary. This proved relevant when both #2 seeds, Bellarmine and Jacksonville, advanced to the championship game. With both having identical conference records, the tiebreaker was applied, and Bellarmine received home court by virtue of its win over Jacksonville in the teams' only regular-season game.

Schedule

Bracket 
Because Bellarmine won the ASUN Tournament, the conference's top overall seed, Jacksonville State, claimed the automatic bid to the NCAA Tournament. The same would have applied if North Alabama had won the tournament, but the Lions were eliminated in the first round.

References 

Tournament
ASUN men's basketball tournament
ASUN men's basketball tournament